Chakli Shujat is a village in Shaheed Bhagat Singh Nagar district of Punjab State, India. The village is administrated by Sarpanch an elected representative of the village. The current village's sarpanch is Mr.Mohinder Pal from scheduled caste community.

Demography 
As of 2011, Chakli Shujat has a total number of 127 houses and population of 602 of which 313 include are males while 289 are females according to the report published by Census India in 2011. The literacy rate of Chakli Shujat is 74.40%, higher than the state average of 75.84%. The population of children under the age of 6 years is 59 which is 9.80% of total population of Chakli Shujat, and child sex ratio is approximately 735 as compared to Punjab state average of 846.

Most of the people are from Schedule Caste which constitutes 66.11% of total population in Chakli Shujat. The town does not have any Schedule Tribe population so far. Other people belong from Jatt sikh and Sansi caste, some peoples also belong from obc category.

As per the report published by Census India in 2011, 234 people were engaged in work activities out of the total population of Chakli Shujat which includes 155 males and 79 females. According to census survey report 2011, 85.90% workers describe their work as main work and 14.10% workers are involved in Marginal activity providing livelihood for less than 6 months.

Education 
The village has a Punjabi medium, co-ed upper primary school founded in 1996. The schools provide mid-day meal as per Indian Midday Meal Scheme and the meal prepared in school premises. As per Right of Children to Free and Compulsory Education Act the school provide free education to children between the ages of 6 and 14.

KC Engineering College and Doaba Khalsa Trust Group Of Institutions are the nearest colleges.

Transport 

See also 
Satnam Satta, a local folk singer belong from this village. He do his shows in Jagratas and Religious fairs.

References

External links 
 Tourism of Punjab 
 Census of Punjab
 Locality Based PINCode

Villages in Shaheed Bhagat Singh Nagar district